Gonagolla is a town in the Ampara District, Eastern Province of Sri Lanka. 

The Gonagolla Vihara, a historic cave temple, which is formally listed as an archaeological site, is located nearby on the road to Ampara.

Schools 
 Dudley Senanayake College
 Rajagalatenna Maha Vidyalaya (Sinhala: අම්/රජගලතැන්න මහා විද්‍යාලය)

Reference 

Towns in Ampara District